The Desertshore Installation is a box set that was released by Throbbing Gristle. The 12-CDr set documents the recording sessions of the cover version of Nico's third studio album, Desertshore. These recordings were made as a document of TG's Desertshore Installation.  These sessions were open to the public and a short question and answer session is included in the recordings. Each session lasted for approximately two hours and there were two sessions per day, an afternoon and an evening session. The box set only had one pressing.

A number of jams recorded during the installation appear on Throbbing Gristle's tour-only album release The Third Mind Movements.

CDr information
 Friday Afternoon Disc A - (1:09:02)
 Friday Afternoon Disc B - (1:04:30)
 Friday Evening Disc A - (1:02:47)
 Friday Evening Disc B - (0:54:06)
 Saturday Afternoon Disc A - (0:48:08)
 Saturday Afternoon Disc B - (0:47:36)
 Saturday Evening Disc A - (1:07:58)
 Saturday Evening Disc B - (0:55:46)
 Sunday Afternoon Disc A - (0:47:15)
 Sunday Afternoon Disc B - (1:01:42)
 Sunday Evening Disc A - (0:46:01)
 Sunday Evening Disc B - (1:07:02)

Session set-lists
Friday, Session 1:
My Only Child - Gen Vox & Jam;
Janitor of Lunacy - Gen Vox & Jam

Friday, Session 2:
Afraid - Gen Vox;
Jam to rhythm tracks;
The Falconer - Gen Vox;

Saturday, Session 3:
Mutterlein - Gen Vox;
Jam Session to Mae Blue Gray;
Le Petit Chevalier - Gen Vox

Saturday, Session 4:
Abschied- Check;
Springbankistan - Jam;
Abschied - Gen Vox;
Janitors of Lunacy - Vox; Mental Jam;
The Falconer - Gentle Vox

Sunday, Session 5:
All that is my own - Jam & Vox;
The Falconer - Jam & Vox;
Janitor of Lunacy - Jam & Vox;
My Only Child - Jam & Vox; Mental Jam;

Sunday, Session 6:
Le Petit Chevalier - Jam & Vox;
Mutterlein - Jam & Vox (mental end);
Afraid - Jam & Vox;
Abschied - Jam & Vox

References

External links 

 Tiny Mix Tapes article on the album
 Fact article on the album

Desertshore Installation
Desertshore Installation